Cormac Boyle (born 1991) is an Irish hurler who plays for Westmeath Senior Championship club Raharney and at inter-county level with the Westmeath senior hurling team. He usually lines out at midfield.

Career

Boyle first came to hurling prominence at juvenile and underage levels with the Raharney club. He eventually joined the club's top adult team at senior level and was part of their County Championship successes in 2014 and 2016. Boyle first appeared on the inter-county scene during a two-year stint with the Westmeath minor hurling team before later lining out at under-21 level as a dual player. He joined the Westmeath senior hurling team in 2012. Boyle has since won two National League Division 2A titles and captained the team to the 2021 Joe McDonagh Cup title.

Honours

Raharney
Westmeath Senior Hurling Championship: 2014, 2016

Westmeath
Joe McDonagh Cup: 2021 (c)
National Hurling League Division 2A: 2016, 2019 (c)

References

1991 births
Living people
UCD hurlers
Raharney hurlers
Westmeath inter-county hurlers
Westmeath inter-county Gaelic footballers
Dual players